The Band of the Welsh Guards is the youngest of the five bands in the Foot Guards Regiments in the Household Division, specifically the Welsh Guards which primarily guards the British monarch.

History 
The Welsh Guards Band was formed in 1915, the same year as the regiment. Unlike other Guards Bands such as that of the Grenadier Guards, the band consisted of 45 people, including a Warrant Officer at the time of its inception, with the instruments having been bought by funds provided by the City of Cardiff.

Because the Welsh Guards Band was formed hundreds of years after military music for ceremonial purpose first arose, high standards had already been set by other Guards ensembles. They first publicly performed proving their worth on March 1, 1916, when they Mounted the King's Guard.

The Welsh Guards Band started its touring career in 1917, early after its formation. In recent years tours have taken the band to European countries such as Belgium and Spain; North America, with tours to the United States and Canada, and a recent tour to Egypt took the band to northern Africa. The band's first commissioned Bandmaster; Lieutenant Harris; was gazetted on March 1, 1919, to the rank of Lieutenant, after serving with the band in his original position for nearly four years. He remained linked with the band until his retirement.

By 1948 there was a new bandmaster, Leslie Statham who was famed for his compositional prowess by both his real name, and his assumed name Arnold Steck. Under his leadership the band played extensively in Canada to large numbers of people, possibly well over one million, whilst performing hundreds of different items. It is thought that this was off the back of the fact that the Bandmaster had performed at venues visited by the band before as a soloist from the Army School of Music Band, at Kneller Hall. Busy Canadian touring was the start of a long tradition of visiting other countries to play. The most notable tour after this one however, was in 1965, where they visited Milan, to play at "British Week", and were accompanied by the "Pipes, Drums and Dancers" of the Scots Guards for a long tour to America two years later.

The band was honoured with playing at the Investiture of Prince Charles as Prince of Wales in July 1969.

In the early 1970s, at the Band's pinnacle of success so far, in fields such as record contracts and appearances at sporting events, Major Desmond Walker died suddenly only weeks before the Band's planned departure for another Canadian and USA tour. The Tour went ahead as a new Director of Music was hastily appointed in the form of Captain Derek Taylor.

During the 1980s the band continued to tour and to build on its successes, touring to Seattle, Australia, Japan, and Paris Vigo, Spain amongst other places. In 1990, the Welsh Guards Band had its first Director of Music, to be promoted to the rank of Lieutenant-Colonel in Peter Hannam,
who two years later gained an MBE, and retired in 1993, as the last National Serviceman in Army Music.

The Current Director of Music was appointed to the Welsh Guards after serving with a number of other bands in 2005 and has earned the Alf Young Memorial Prize for Best Church Service, whilst on his Student Bandmasters' Course.

Band membership duties
Musicians currently in the band have secondary roles in the British Army as Chemical Decontamination Assistants, Medics and Drivers. The band is based at Wellington barracks in St James's London.

Regimental Marches
The Regimental Quick March is the Rising of the Lark and the Regimental Slow March is Men of Harlech.

Ensembles 

There are several ensembles within the band of the Welsh Guards:
 Concert band
 Marching band
 Dance Band
 Fanfare Team
 Salon Orchestra

Events 
The band of the Welsh Guards plays regularly for occasions and events. Some of these events that are most famous are listed below, although this is not a comprehensive list.

 Changing of the Guard
 The Festival of Remembrance
 Trooping the Colour
 Beating the Retreat

The band also performs at other non-military events, including numerous radio and television appearances. The band can be seen near the beginning of the 1956 film, Around the World in 80 Days (even though the film is set several decades prior to the band's formation).

Key personnel
Director of Music: Major Lauren Petritz-Watts
Bandmaster: WO2 Michael McGowan
Band Sergeant Major: WO2 Neal Grimwood

See also 
 Coldstream Guards Band
 Grenadier Guards Band
 Irish Guards Band
 Band of the Scots Guards
 Household Division

References

External links 
 Home of Welsh Guards Band
 Former website
 Band History 

Band
British ceremonial units
Royal Corps of Army Music
Music organisations based in Wales
Musical groups established in 1915
1915 establishments in the United Kingdom